The vice president of Federated States of Micronesia is the second highest position in Federated States of Micronesia. The vice president is elected by the Congress of the Federated States of Micronesia from among the at-large members for a four-year term. The vice president is also a part of the legislature. The annual salary of the vice president is set to US$70,000.

The history of the office holders is as follows:

List of vice presidents

References

See also
List of current vice presidents

 
Micronesia
1979 establishments in the Trust Territory of the Pacific Islands
Vice presidents